Soth Polin is a famous Cambodian writer. He was born in the hamlet of Chroy Thmar, Kampong Siem District, Kampong Cham Province, Cambodia. His maternal great-grandfather was the poet Nou Kan (who wrote Teav-Ek, ទាវឯក, a version of Tum Teav, the masterpiece of Khmer love poetry).  He grew up speaking both French and Khmer. Throughout his youth, he immersed himself in the classical literature of Cambodia and, at the same time, the literature and philosophy of the West.

His first novel, A Meaningless Life, published in 1965 (he was 22 years old), was strongly influenced by Nietzsche, Freud, Sartre and Buddhist philosophy. It was an enormous success. Numerous novels and short stories followed, among them The Adventurer With No Goal, A Bored Man, We Die Only Once, and Dead Heart. He also worked as a journalist in Khmer Ekareach (The Independent Khmer), the newspaper of his uncle, Sim Var, and in the late 1960s, he founded (with Sin Kim Suy) his own newspaper and publishing house, Nokor Thom (នគរធំ / The Great Kingdom). He was a militant nationalist who was both anti-Sihanouk and anti-communist. Through his newspaper, he supported the pro-American government of General Lon Nol before finally distancing himself and suddenly taking refuge in France in 1974, after the assassination of his friend, Thach Chea, the Deputy Minister of Education.

His father and two of his brothers died during the Khmer Rouge regime. He worked in Paris as a taxi driver and published his dark cult novel The Anarchist, written in French. Later he and his two sons moved to the West Coast of the United States, where he now resides. His brother-in-law is Mam Sonando.

Novels and novellas (in Khmer) 
 ជីវិតឥតន័យ (A Meaningless Life, Phnom Penh, 1965; republished by Nokor Thom in the 1970s; republished in Paris by L'Institut de l'Asie du Sud-Est in the 1980s) .
 ខូចសតិព្រោះកាមតណ្ហា (Crazy for Sex, Phnom Penh, 1965).
 ស្នេហ៍អពមង្គល (A Miserable Love, Phnom Penh, 1965).
 អូនជាម្ចាស់ស្នេហ៍ (You Are My Heart, Phnom Penh, 1966).
 ក្ស័យតែម្ដងទេ (We Die Only Once, Phnom Penh, 1967).
 ចំតិតឥតអាសូរ (Fucking/Showing My Ass with No Mercy, Phnom Penh, 1967), banned by Sihanouk authorities and secretly republished under the title ចំតិតទៀតហើយ (Fucking/Showing My Ass Again).
 បុរសអផ្សុក (A Bored Man, Phnom Penh, 1968).
 អ្នកផ្សងព្រេងអារាត់អារាយ (The Adventurer with No Goal, Phnom Penh, 1969; republished by L'Institut de l'Asie du Sud-Est, Paris, 1982)
 អ្នកមេម៉ាយនៅអិល-អេ (The Widow from L.A., Long Beach, 1993).
 ស្នេហាដាច់ខ្យល់នៅឡាសវ៉េហ្គាស (Love Vanishes in Las Vegas, Long Beach, 1995).

Collections of short stories (in Khmer)
 ឲ្យបងធ្វើអី... បងធ្វើដែរ! (Whatever You Order Me... I Will Do It, Phnom Penh, 1969) : 1.ការទាក់ទងគ្នា... 2.បង្គាប់មកបងចុះអូន!...3.អ្វីៗដែលផ្លាស់ប្ដូ!... 4.ឲ្យបងធ្វើអី... បងធ្វើដែរ!
 មរណៈក្នុងដួងចិត្ត (Dead Heart, Phnom Penh, 1973) : 1.ព្រលឹងប្ដីអើយ... ខ្លួនអូនរហែក... 2.រកគន្លិះប្ដីខ្ញុំ... មិនឃើញសោះ... 3.ពស់ក្បាលពីរ... 4.ក្បាលបោកផ្ទប់នឹងជញ្ជាំង... 5.ស៊ូទ្រាំគ្រាំគ្រាយូរមកហើយ... 6.មរណៈក្នុងដួងចិត្ត...
 ស្ដេចចង់ (The Game of the King's Desire, Long Beach, 1992) : 1.ស្ដេចចង់ 2.កសាងស្រមោលអតិតៈ 3.ក្លិនតណ្ហានៅហ្វ្រេស្ណូ

Play (in Khmer)
 បាក់ធ្មេញ (Broken Tooth, Long Beach, 1995).

Essays, articles and translation (in Khmer)
 ស្រុកយើងមានសន្តិភាពមែនឬ?, Nokor Thom, 1974.
 ស្រុកយើងអើយវេទនាដោយសារគេ, Nokor Thom, 1974.
 ជីវប្រវត្តិសង្ខេបនៃទស្សនវិទូក្រិកដ៍ល្បីល្បាញជាងគេក្នុងបុរាណកាល (translation of François Fénelon's book: Abrégé des vies des anciens philosophes), 2004, Angkor Borey.
 Political pamphlets online, Devaraja, 2005.
 Preface of Sang Savat’s novel, The Big Thief at the Border (:km:រឿងមហាចោរនៅទល់ដែន) written in 1955 and republished by Nokor Thom in 1973 (Sang Savat was allegedly murdered by government officer in 1958 on Kirirom Mountain).

Novel and short stories (in French)
 L'Anarchiste (Éditions de la Table ronde, novel, Paris, 1980; republished in 2011, with a preface by Patrick Deville).
« The Anarchist flouts the mythology of "la belle France" and takes us to an entrepôt of broken dreams where the trauma of war haunts a Cambodian émigré, whose monologue comprises the second half of the novel. In Paris, weeks after the fall of the Khmer Rouge, the Cambodian taxi-driver Virak unburdens himself of a terrible secret. His audience is fresh road-kill: a young English tourist who is a victim of his distracted driving. Unlike other Europeans in the novel, who impose their own journalistic or ethnographic narratives on Cambodia, she cannot talk back. » (Penny Edwards, Berkeley University).
 Des lunettes pour la frime, short story, Paris (unpublished).
 Du café sans sucre, short story, Paris (unpublished).

Essays, articles, and miscellaneous works (in French)
 La composition française au DESPC, Phnom Penh, 1964, with Ke Sokhan and To Chhun.
 Contes et récits du Cambodge, Pich-Nil Éditeur, Phnom Penh, 1966.
 Kompong Cham, symbole de notre survie (deux ans de pourrissement / les sauveurs), Nokor Thom, Phnom Penh, 1973.
 Aperçu sur l'évolution de la presse au Cambodge, with Sin Kim Suy, Phnom Penh, 1974 (translated in English and published in Newspapers in Asia: Contemporary Trends and problems, edited by John A. Lent, 219-37, Hong Kong: Heinemann Asia, 1982).
 Dictionnaire Français-Khmer, Phnom Penh, 1974.
 Témoignages sur le génocide du Cambodge (Testimonies of the Genocide of Kampuchea), collected from Cambodian refugees on the border of Thailand; one of the first books to alert the world about the genocide in progress in Cambodia, co-authored with :fr:Bernard Hamel, Paris, S.P.L., 1976.
 De Sang et de Larmes : la Grande Déportation du Cambodge, (co-authored with :fr:Bernard Hamel, but Soth Polin didn't want to reveal his authorship, because he feared reprisals against his family), Albin Michel, Paris, 1977.
 Petit dictionnaire français-khmer, Boulogne-Billancourt, CAMA [Comité inter-missions pour les réfugiés du Sud-Est asiatique en France], 1980.
 La diabolique douceur de Pol Pot, Le Monde, 1980. Translated from French to English by Jeremy Colvin and Lavonne Leong, Mānoa, University of Hawaii Press, 2004, The Diabolic Sweetness of Pol Pot.
 L’histoire d'une malédiction (ou le malheur d'être cambodgien), :fr:Revue universelle des Faits et des idées, Paris, 1980.
 Et le Cambodge bascula dans la guerre, :fr:Revue universelle des Faits et des idées, 1980.
 Et Bouddha, le "saccageur de rêves" usurpa le trône divin, :fr:Revue universelle des Faits et des idées, Paris, 1981.
 Histoire du jeune moine qui voulut être crocodile, :fr:Revue universelle des Faits et des idées, 1981.
 Hari-Hara ou la divinité fondatrice d'Angkor, :fr:Revue universelle des Faits et des idées, 1982.
 Les chemins de l'Apocalypse, 350 pages, 1998 (unpublished).

Translations of his work
 Soth Polin translated and adapted his own novel ចំតិតឥតអាសូរ (Fucking/Showing My Ass with No Mercy, Phnom Penh, 1967) into French, to use it as the first part of L'Anarchiste.
 ひとづきあい Communicate, They Say (ការទាក់ទងគ្នា...) from 僕に命令しておくれ (ឲ្យបងធ្វើអី... បងធ្វើដែរ / Whatever You Order Me... I Will Do It, 1969), translated from Khmer to Japanese by Tomoko Okada (岡田知子), in Modern Short Stories (現代カンボジア短編集), Cambodian Studies, Tokyo University of Foreign Studies, The Daido Life Foundation (大同生命国際文化基金), 2001.
 Communiquer, disent-ils... Translated from Khmer to French by Christophe Macquet, in Revue Europe, "Écrivains du Cambodge", 81e année, N° 889 / Mai 2003. See also Revue bilingue MEET, n°15, Porto Rico / Phnom Penh, 2011.
 Communicate, They Say, translated from Khmer to French by Christophe Macquet and from French to English by Jean Toyama, In the Shadow of Angkor: Contemporary Writing From Cambodia, Mānoa, University of Hawaii Press (2004).
 Demonic Fragrance (ក្លិនតណ្ហានៅហ្វ្រេស្ណូ from ស្ដេចចង់, The Game of the King's Desire, 1992), short story translated into English by his two sons, Bora Soth and Norith Soth (unpublished).
 The Anarchist (extract), translated by Penny Edwards, in Words Without Borders Magazine, November 2015.
 Soth Polin, with an extract of The Anarchist translated by Penny Edwards, in Mekong Review, Volume 1, Number 1, November 2015.
 Génial et génital The four short stories of ឲ្យបងធ្វើអី... បងធ្វើដែរ! (Whatever You Order Me... I Will Do It, Phnom Penh, 1969), translated from Khmer to French and prefaced by Christophe Macquet, Editions Le Grand Os, France, September 2017.
 Nul ne peut faire revivre les morts កសាងស្រមោលអតិតៈ, the second short story of ស្ដេចចង់ (The Game of the King's Desire, Long Beach, 1992), translated from Khmer to French by Christophe Macquet, Éditions Jentayu, magazine of Asian literature in French, Volume 9, 2019.
 L’anarchico translated from French to Italian by Alessandro Giarda, Obarrao Edizioni, in-Asia/Cambogia, 2019.

Quotes
 "ហា!ហា! អ្នកមានលុយប្រាក់ម៉ឺនក្នុងហោប៉ៅ ក៏មិនអាចទិញកន្លែងអង្គុយ ឱ្យស្រួលជាងអញដែរ។" (ជីវិតឥតន័យ) / "Ah ! Ah ! No matter how rich, these people will never be able to buy a place to sit as comfortable as mine." (A Meaningless Life, Phnom Penh, 1965). 
 "Do you realize that I’ve been the epitome of absolute evil from birth? I’m sure of it. I’m not my father’s son but the child of the devil." (The Anarchist, 1980) 
 "I remember that when I was about four and a half, I wrote the word ចង្រ្កានបាយ /cɑŋkraan-baay/ (kitchen). I was studying writing, trying to be like my great-grandfather. But I did not finish the word, writing only ចង្រ្កានបា /cɑŋkraan-baa/. I left out the យ (the letter /y/). My father said to me : “When you become a man, you will never finish your work”." (Beyond Words, 2004)
 "All men of politics are deeply religious, but they kill. The more pious he is, the more ferocious." (The Anarchist, 1980)

See also

 Chuth Khay
 Hak Chhay Hok
 Keng Vannsak
 Khun Srun
 Kong Bunchhoeun
 Mam Sonando
 Norodom Sihanouk
 Sim Var
 Vandy Kaonn

References

External links
 The Power of his Pen, by Janet Wiscombe, in Long Beach Press-Telegram, November 19, 1995.
 The Mighty Pen of New Phnom Penh, by Janet Wiscombe, in Los Angeles Times, April 26, 1998.
 The debris of the visible, Thomas Beller, in Cambodia Daily, Aug 26, 2006 - Review of Frank Stewart and Sharon May (ed.) In the Shadow of Angkor: Contemporary Writing From Cambodia, Mānoa, University of Hawaii Press (2004).
 An Interview with Soth Polin by Sharon May, Mānoa, University of Hawaii Press, 2004.
 Song by Cambodian-French rock band Véalsrè based on "L'Anarchiste". Video directed by Rithy Panh, with a live performance of French-Cambodian artist Séra (2005).
 Women, Sexuality and Politics in Modern Cambodian Literature: The Case of Soth Polin's Short Story, by Klairung Amratisha, MANUSYA: Journal of Humanities, Special Issue No.14, 2007.
 Photographs, March 1980, Ulf Andersen.
 The Anarchist: The Odyssey of Soth Polin, documentary film trailer by Norith Soth, 2014.
 Soth Polin, romancier cambodgien, et branleur de langue, by Fabien Ribéry, October 2017.
 « Génial et Génital », de Soth Polin : chez les malheureux du monde, by David Ferrière, in Addict-culture Magazine, February 2018.
 Writing the Postcolonial City: Phnom Penh and Modernity during Sangkum Reastr Niyum, 1955-1970, dissertation by Siti Galang Keo, University of California, Berkeley, Summer 2019.
 Le mal de l'Histoire et le mal de la vie dans L'Anarchiste de Soth Polin, article by Daniele Speziari, 2020.
 Don’t look away (On translating Soth Polin's L'anarchiste), article by Penny Edwards, in Words Without Borders Magazine, February 2022.

Cambodian male writers
People from Kampong Cham province
Cambodian emigrants to France
Cambodian taxi drivers
1943 births
Living people
Cambodian novelists
Cambodian short story writers
Male novelists
Male short story writers
20th-century novelists
20th-century short story writers
20th-century male writers
20th-century Cambodian writers
21st-century Cambodian writers